Jonathan Davies  ( – 1809) was an English schoolmaster and Anglican priest, a Canon of Windsor from 1782 to 1791.

Career

He was educated at King's College, Cambridge, receiving an MA in 1736.

He was appointed:
Headmaster of Eton College, Berkshire 1773–1792
Rector of Scaldwell, Northamptonshire, 1774
Provost of Eton College, 1791–1809

He was appointed to the eighth stall in St George's Chapel, Windsor Castle in 1782 and held the canonry until 1791. He was elected a fellow of the Royal Society in 1789.

He died in 1809 and was buried at Eton College chapel.

References 

1809 deaths
Canons of Windsor
Alumni of King's College, Cambridge
Head Masters of Eton College
Year of birth unknown
Fellows of the Royal Society
Provosts of Eton College